"Blue Blue (Victoria)" is a song written and recorded by English musician Bruce Woolley in 1980.

Magnus Uggla version
Magnus Uggla wrote lyrics in Swedish as "IQ", recording it for his 1983 album Välkommen till folkhemmet. He wrote the song's lyrics after being kicked out from Café Opera. The single peaked at number two on the Swedish Singles Chart.

Single track listing
IQ (Blue Blue (Victoria))
Raggare

Charts

Magnus Uggla version

References

1983 singles
1980 songs
Magnus Uggla songs
Songs written by Bruce Woolley